Please Transpose EP is the final release and promotional seven-track EP plus 1-track of their only music Video "You Make Me" by the now-defunct Filipino pop-rock band The Eraserheads. In this EP, the name of the band was shortened to "Eheads". This is the only release of the band after the departure of their former vocalist Ely Buendia and features a female vocalist replacement, Kris Gorra-Dancel (from the band Fatal Posporos). The EP was independently issued in 2002 in CD-R format only.

The album contains five new songs from the band ("You Make Me," "Everything's Falling," "Iccentric," "Lahat," and "It's Not You (It's Me)") and two remake tracks ("Dahan-dahan" from their album Natin99 and "Paru-parong Ningning" from their album Cutterpillow) and an additional music video for "You Make Me".

Release
This is the only official release of the band after the departure of their vocalist Ely Buendia. The group eventually renamed themselves as  Cambio and subsequently recorded a number of well-received commercial albums under the new name.

Track listing
 "You Make Me" - 03:23
 "Everything's Falling" - 04:24
 "Iccentric" - 03:03
 "Lahat" - 03:27
 "It's Not You (It's Me)" - 04:47
 "Dahan-dahan" - 02:31
 "Paru-parong Ningning" - 02:42
 "You Make Me" (Music Video)

References

2002 EPs
Eraserheads albums